St Joseph's Catholic High School is a coeducational Roman Catholic secondary school and sixth form located in Slough, Berkshire, England.

Ofsted in their most recent (2016) report described the school as a good school with outstanding features. The school previously  held Performing Arts status.

Previously a voluntary aided school administered by Slough Borough Council, in December 2016 St Joseph's Catholic High School converted to academy status. The school is now sponsored by the St Thomas Catholic Academies Trust.

Notable former pupils
Ryan Ford, former footballer
Lloyd Owusu, former footballer
Matty Cash, Professional Footballer for Aston Villa and Poland

References

Secondary schools in Slough
Academies in Slough
Catholic secondary schools in the Diocese of Northampton